The Campbell Hotel, located in northwest Portland, Oregon, is a historic former residential hotel that is listed on the National Register of Historic Places (NRHP).  It is now an apartment building named the Campbell Court Apartments.

See also
 National Register of Historic Places listings in Northwest Portland, Oregon

References

1912 establishments in Oregon
Colonial Revival architecture in Oregon
Georgian Revival architecture in Oregon
Hotel buildings completed in 1912
Hotel buildings on the National Register of Historic Places in Portland, Oregon
Northwest District, Portland, Oregon
Apartment buildings on the National Register of Historic Places in Portland, Oregon
Portland Historic Landmarks
Individually listed contributing properties to historic districts on the National Register in Oregon